Upper Shoreface refers to the portion of the seafloor that is shallow enough to be agitated by everyday wave action, the wave base.  

Below that is the lower shoreface.

Process
The continuous agitation of the sea floor in the upper shoreface environment results in sediments that are winnowed of the smallest grains, leaving only those grains heavy enough that the water cannot keep them suspended.

Depth of influence
Seawater is moved in a vertical circular motion when a wave passes.  The radius of the circle of motion for any given water molecule decreases with depth.  

The maximum depth of influence of a water wave is half the wavelength. Below that depth the water remains stationary as the wave passes.  

However, a wave with a  wavelength would be moving the water (barely) at the bottom.

See also
Dispersion (water waves)
Lower shoreface
Waves and shallow water

References

Physical oceanography
Wave mechanics